This is a list of top-division football clubs in non-FIFA countries.

On the 26 members of the Nouvelle Fédération-Board, only 9 have an autonomous football league system: Chagos Islands, Gozo, Gibraltar, Greenland, Kiribati, Somaliland, Turkish Republic of Northern Cyprus, Tuvalu and Zanzibar.

NF-Board

Non NF-Board countries

Notes 
Åland has its own championship tournament during the winter break, but during the regular season all of the clubs compete either in the Finnish or the Swedish football league system.
Chechnya has no domestic league, and all these clubs competed in the Russian football league system.
In Juan Fernández Islands there are four amateur clubs, playing only one level.
In Nauru were six amateur clubs, playing only one level.
In Saint-Pierre and Miquelon there are three amateur clubs, playing only one level.

See also 
Ålands Fotbollförbund
Chechnya Football Federation
Liga de Fútbol de Juan Fernández
List of football clubs in Gozo
List of football clubs in Greenland
List of football clubs in Kiribati
List of football clubs in Northern Cyprus
List of football clubs in Tuvalu
List of football clubs in Zanzibar
List of association football competitions
Nauru Soccer League
Ligue de Football de Saint Pierre et Miquelon
 List of top-division football clubs in AFC countries
List of second division football clubs in AFC countries
 List of top-division football clubs in CAF countries
 List of top-division football clubs in CONCACAF countries
 List of top-division football clubs in CONMEBOL countries
 List of top-division football clubs in OFC countries
 List of top-division football clubs in UEFA countries
 List of second division football clubs in UEFA countries

References

+
+Non-FIFA